Kings High School may refer to:

 Kings High School (Kings Mills, Ohio)
 The King's High School for Girls, an independent day school in Warwick, England
 The Bourne Academy, formerly known as Kings High School, a mixed secondary school in Bournemouth, Dorset, England
 King's High School, Dunedin